The Commonwealth Club is a private members' club in Canberra, Australian Capital Territory, founded by Frank Lukis in 1954.

The clubhouse overlooks Lake Burley Griffin, and has been the club's home since 1965. It is on Forster Crescent, Yarralumla, between the Embassy of the Russian Federation and Embassy of Brazil, and shares a garden fence with the Embassy of South Africa and the Embassy of Pakistan.

Membership, while not limited to a particular profession or demographic, is prohibitively expensive for the general public. Initiation fees run at over $3,000 AUD, and annual dues are ~$1,500.

References

External links
Official website

Buildings and structures in Canberra
Organisations based in Canberra
Gentlemen's clubs in Australia
1954 establishments in Australia
Organizations established in 1954